Kjell Fjørtoft (5 March 1930 – 14 May 2010) was a Norwegian journalist, non-fiction writer, photographer and film maker, born in Tromsø.

Fjørtoft wrote books about themes such as World War II, espionage and hunters. Among his books are Spionfamilien from 1986, about the convicted spy Selmer Nilsen and his family. He produced 25 television programmes for the Norwegian Broadcasting Corporation, and also produced more than thirty film documentaries about Northern Norway. He was awarded Troms County's Cultural Prize for 1983. Fjørtoft died on 14 May 2010.

Selected works

Books
 Troms med bankene utenfor (1966)
 Dramaet på Arnøy (1981)
 Vi fikk vår frihet (1984)
 Spionfamilien (1986)
 Mot stupet. Norge inn i krigen (1989)
 Ulvetiden. Krig og samarbeid (1990)
 På feil side. Den andre krigen (1991)
 Oppgjøret som aldri tok slutt (1997)

Films
 Hummerfisket på Nordøyane (1959)
 Lille Moskva (1983)

References

1930 births
Norwegian non-fiction writers
Norwegian journalists
NRK people
Writers from Tromsø
2010 deaths